Timebomb is the fourth studio album by German heavy metal band  U.D.O. It was recorded and mixed at Dierks Studios in Cologne from November 1990 to February 1991. The album is considered the band's heaviest following a light approach on Faceless World.

The band was aided by Gaby "Deaffy" Hawke on lyrics. Deaffy was also the author of the English lyrics on the Accept albums, and is a pseudonym for Gaby Hoffmann (maiden name Hauke), manager of Accept and later married to the guitarist Wolf Hoffmann.

Timebomb was the band's last release with Mathias Dieth and Thomas Smuszynski, who went on to join Running Wild in 1992. It was also their last release until 1997's Solid; in the time between, Udo Dirkschneider took part in the Accept reunion which resulted in three albums.

Track listing

Credits
Udo Dirkschneider – vocals
Mathias Dieth – guitars
Thomas Smuszynski – bass
Stefan Schwarzmann – drums

Production
Stefan Kaufmann – production
Uli Baronowsky – engineering, mixing
Tim Eckhorst – design (anniversary edition)
Andreas Marschall – cover art

References

1991 albums
U.D.O. albums
RCA Records albums